Honduras and the United States have had formal relations since 1830. There is close cooperation between the two countries, particularly in the areas of the War on Drugs while the National Port Authority in Puerto Cortés is part of the U.S. Bureau of Customs and Border Protection's Container Security Initiative.

During the 1980s, Honduras supported U.S. policy opposing governments in Nicaragua and opposing an active insurgency in El Salvador. In June 2005, Honduras became the first country in the hemisphere to sign a Millennium Challenge Account (MCA) compact with the US Government. Honduras failed the corruption indicator required for continued funding into 2008. MCC will closely follow Honduras's progress on reducing corruption under an approved "remediation plan."

The United States recognized President Manuel Zelaya, ousted from power in the 2009 Honduran coup d'état, as the only constitutional president of Honduras. "We believe that the coup was not legal and that President Zelaya remains the democratically elected president there," US President Barack Obama said. Although U.S. officials have characterized the events as a coup, suspended joint military operations and all non-emergency, non-immigrant visas, and cut off certain non-humanitarian aid to Honduras, they have held back from formally designating Zelaya's ouster as a "military coup", which would require them to cut off almost all aid to Honduras. 

The United States subsequently warned the Micheletti government that it might not recognize the results of the November 29 elections if Zelaya was not allowed to return to power first, and ultimately indicated that the November election would not be recognized, persuading the Micheletti regime to refer Zelaya's return to the Honduran Congress.

The United States maintains a presence at the Soto Cano Air Base in Comayagua; the two countries conduct joint peacekeeping, counter-narcotics, humanitarian, disaster relief, and civic action exercises. U.S. troops conduct and provide logistics support for a variety of bilateral and multilateral exercises, medical, engineering, peacekeeping, counternarcotics, and disaster relief.

Trade
In 2004, the United States signed the U.S.-Central America Free Trade Agreement (CAFTA) with Honduras, El Salvador, Nicaragua, Guatemala, Costa Rica, and the Dominican Republic. The legislatures of all signatories except Costa Rica ratified CAFTA in 2005, and the agreement entered into force in the first half of 2006. CAFTA eliminates tariffs and other barriers to trade in goods, services, agricultural products, and investments. Additionally, CAFTA is expected to solidify democracy, encourage greater regional integration, and provide safeguards for environmental protection and labor rights.

Bilateral trade between the two nations totaled $7.4 billion in 2006, up from $7 billion in 2005. Exports of goods and services from the U.S. increased from $3.24 billion in 2005 to $3.69 billion in 2006, while Honduran exports to the U.S. fell slightly from $3.75 billion in 2005 to $3.72 billion in 2006 More than 150 American companies operate in Honduras; U.S. franchises are present in increasing numbers. U.S.-Honduran trade is dominated by the Honduran maquila industry, which imports yarn and textiles from the United States and exports finished articles of clothing. Other leading Honduran exports to the United States include coffee, bananas, seafood (particularly shrimp), minerals (including zinc, lead, gold, and silver), and other fruits and vegetables. Two-way trade with Honduras in 2006 was $7.4 billion, up from $7.0 billion in 2005. For 2007 through October, Honduran exports to the United States increased 6%, and U.S. exports to Honduras increased 18% when compared to the same period in 2006.

U.S. investors account for nearly two-thirds of the foreign direct investment (FDI) in Honduras. The stock of U.S. direct investment in Honduras in 2005 was $402 million, up from $339 million in 2004. The overall flow of FDI into Honduras in 2005 totaled $568 million, $196 million of which was spent in the maquila sector. The United States continued as the largest contributor of FDI. The most substantial U.S. investments in Honduras are in the maquila sector, fruit production (particularly bananas, melons, and pineapple), tourism, energy generation, shrimp aquaculture, animal feed production, telecommunications, fuel distribution, cigar manufacturing, insurance, brewing, leasing, food processing, and furniture manufacturing. Many U.S. franchises, particularly in the restaurant sector, operate in Honduras.

Assistance
The USAID budget for Honduras is $37 million for fiscal year 2007. Hurricane Mitch in 1998 left hundreds of thousands homeless, devastated the road network and other public infrastructure, and crippled certain key sectors of the economy, causing more than $3 billion in damages to homes, hospitals, schools, roads, farms, and businesses. The United States provided more than $461 million in immediate disaster relief and humanitarian aid spread over the years 1998–2001. The Peace Corps has been active in Honduras since 1962, and currently the program is one of the largest in the world. In 2005, there were 220 Peace Corps Volunteers working in the country.

The role of the Honduran armed forces has changed significantly in recent years as many institutions formerly controlled by the military are now under civilian authority. The annual defense and police budgets have hovered at around $35 million during the past few years. Honduras receives modest U.S. security assistance funds and training. In the absence of a large security assistance program, defense cooperation has taken the form of increased participation by the Honduran armed forces in military-to-military contact programs and bilateral and multilateral combined exercises oriented toward peacekeeping, disaster relief, humanitarian/civic assistance, and counternarcotics. The U.S. Joint Task Force Bravo (JTF-B), stationed at the Honduran Soto Cano Air Base, plays a vital role in supporting combined exercises in Honduras and in neighboring Central American countries. JTF-Bravo plays a critical role in helping the United States respond to natural disasters in Central America by serving as a platform for rescue missions, repairing critical infrastructure, and in meeting high priority health and sanitation needs. JTF-Bravo forces have helped deliver millions of dollars worth of privately donated goods to those in need.

Political involvement
The Obama Administration's attempts to pressure Honduras into reversing the removal of Zelaya in 2009 were complicated by Republican minority party efforts to reach out to and advocate on behalf of the Roberto Micheletti government, as well as by a recent Republican-commissioned report by US Law Library of Congress that supports the constitutionality of Zelaya's removal from office, while condemning his expatriation. In turn, the Democratic chairmen of the House and Senate foreign relations committees asked the Law Library of Congress to retract the report, charging that it "contains factual errors and is based on a flawed legal analysis that has been refuted by experts from the United States, the Organization of American States and Honduras."

Opinion poll of how Hondurans see Americans
According to a global opinion poll, 81% of Hondurans viewed the U.S. positively in 2002. According to the 2012 U.S. Global Leadership Report, 38% of Hondurans approved of U.S. leadership, with 13% disapproving and 49% uncertain. By 2016, the U.S. Global Leadership Report showed approval numbers had increased to 56%, but disapproval had also increased to 32%, with the percentage unsure or who refused dropping to 12%.

Diplomatic missions
The U.S. Embassy in Honduras is located in Tegucigalpa.

See also

 Foreign relations of Honduras
 Honduran Americans
 Foreign relations of the United States

References

Further reading

 Buvollen, Hans Petter. "Low-Intensity Warfare and the Peace Plan in Central America." Bulletin of Peace Proposals 20.3 (1989): 319–334.
 Colby, Jason M. "Reagan and Central America." in A Companion to Ronald Reagan (2015): 434+.
 Euraque, Darío A. Reinterpreting the Banana Republic: region and state in Honduras, 1870-1972 (U of North Carolina Press, 1996).
 Maxwell, William. "Honduran Americans." Gale Encyclopedia of Multicultural America, edited by Thomas Riggs, (3rd ed., vol. 2, Gale, 2014), pp. 345–355. online
 Merrill, Tim, ed. Honduras: A country study (United States Government Printing, 1995).
 Schulz,  Donald E. and Deborah Sundloff Schulz. The United States, Honduras, and the Crisis in Central America (Routledge, 2018) online.

External links
 History of Honduras - U.S. relations

 
United States
Bilateral relations of the United States